The United Nations General Assembly resolution 498 was approved on February 1, 1951, in response to the intervention of Chinese troops in Korean War.

It was the first time in which United Nations treated a nation as an aggressor.

Background

In late 1950, hundreds of thousands of Chinese troops crossed into North Korea to help the troops of North Korea to fight the coalition led by United States and South Korea.

The General Assembly vote followed unsuccessful attempts by the U.S. delegation to the United Nations to have the Security Council take action against the Chinese. Exercising his nation's veto power, the Soviet representative on the Security Council consistently blocked the U.S. effort. Turning to the General Assembly, the U.S. delegation called for the United Nations to condemn communist China as an aggressor in Korea.

The resolution in few words
The resolution had 3 main points:
 The aggression of the People's Republic of China is condemned
 The Chinese troops are exhorted to leave Korea
 The United Nations member states are exhorted to continue supporting the U.N. troops in Korea

The voting in detail
For

 Brazil

 Chile

 Philippines

Against

 Burma

Abstentions

 Syria
 Yemen

Aftermath

The action was largely symbolic, because many nations were reluctant to take more forceful action against the People's Republic of China for fear that the conflict in Korea would escalate. While economic and political sanctions could have been brought against China, the United Nations decided to take no further action. The Korean War continued for 2 more years, finally ending in a stalemate and an armistice in 1953.

See also
United Nations General Assembly resolution
United Nations Security Council resolution

References

United Nations General Assembly resolutions
Korean War
1951 in the United Nations
February 1951 events
Korea and the United Nations
China and the United Nations